Šentanel ( or ) is a settlement in the hills northwest of Prevalje in the Carinthia region in northern Slovenia.

Name
The name of the settlement was changed from Šent Danijel (literally, '"Saint" Daniel') to Spodnja Jamnica (literally, 'lower cave') in 1955. The name was changed on the basis of the 1948 Law on Names of Settlements and Designations of Squares, Streets, and Buildings as part of efforts by Slovenia's postwar communist government to remove religious elements from toponyms. The name Šent Danijel was restored in a contracted form in 1970 as Šentanel.

Church
The parish church, from which the village gets its name, is dedicated to the Prophet Daniel. The current building was built in 1865 but remains of the original 12th-century building are visible in the belfry.

References

External links
Šentanel on Geopedia

Populated places in the Municipality of Prevalje